Jacqueline Mazéas (10 October 1920 – 9 July 2012) was a French athlete who competed mainly in the discus event. She was born in Denain, Nord. She competed for France in the 1948 Summer Olympics held in London, United Kingdom in the discus where she won the bronze medal.

References

1920 births
2012 deaths
French female discus throwers
Olympic bronze medalists for France
Athletes (track and field) at the 1948 Summer Olympics
Olympic athletes of France
Medalists at the 1948 Summer Olympics
Olympic bronze medalists in athletics (track and field)